Simon Alexander Haley (March 8, 1892 – August 19, 1973) was a professor of agriculture, and father of writer Alex Haley. He was born in Savannah, Tennessee, to farmer Alexander "Alec" Haley and his wife Queen (Davy) Haley (née Jackson). Both his parents were born as slaves, and both were apparently fathered by caucasian slave owners. Simon attended Lane College in Jackson, Tennessee, at age 15.

After he was discharged honorably from the army after World War I, on September 28, 1920, he married Bertha George Palmer, the daughter of William E. and Cynthia Murray Palmer of Henning, Tennessee. Bertha was also a student from Lane College. The couple had three sons - Alexander Murray Palmer (1921-1992), George Williford Boyce (1925-2015), and Julius Cornell Embree (1930-2010) (who became an architect). Simon then finished his master's degree in agriculture at Cornell University. Bertha died on 16 Feb 1932 in Normal, Madison County, Alabama after suffering for a year from "general glandular tuberculosis" according to her death certificate. In September, 1932, Simon was married to professor Zeona Eubank Hatcher with whom he had a daughter, Lois Ann (1933-2004). Simon Haley had positions at various southern universities including Alabama A&M just north of Huntsville, Alabama. He died in Martinsburg, Berkeley County, WV and was buried at Little Rock National Cemetery in Little Rock, Arkansas.

Haley lineage
DNA testing of Simon's grandson Chris (via his youngest son Julius) revealed that Simon's father Alec was most likely descended from Scottish ancestors via William Harwell Baugh, an overseer of an Alabama slave plantation.

Notes

Cornell University College of Agriculture and Life Sciences alumni
1892 births
1973 deaths
Lane College alumni
Burials at Little Rock National Cemetery